Garmianak (also Romanized as Garmīānak and Garmeyānak; also known as Garmīāneh, Qal‘a Garmianeh, and Qal‘eh Garmiānek) is a village in Shirez Rural District, Bisotun District, Harsin County, Kermanshah Province, Iran. At the 2006 census, its population was 287, in 69 families.

References 

Populated places in Harsin County